Sir Clive Cowdery (born 26 May 1963) is an English businessman and philanthropist who made a personal fortune in the insurance industry, founding two FTSE100 insurers and a third insurer which has deployed circa $5bn in capital with $90bn in assets, and has since donated large amounts to charity, including the Resolution Foundation which he founded in 2005.

Early life
Born of Anglo Danish parentage in Bristol, England, in 1963, he is the second of five siblings. He was educated at Clevedon Comprehensive School (now Clevedon Community School), and earned three O-levels and no A-levels.

Career
Cowdery is founder and executive chairman of Resolution Life, a global life insurance group focusing on the acquisition and management of portfolios of life insurance policies.

From 1998 to 2003, Cowdery was chairman and chief executive of General Electric Insurance Holdings, with operations in 12 countries in Europe.

In 2003, Cowdery founded his private company Resolution, which invests in life insurance consolidation. Since then, Cowdery’s Resolution companies have deployed c. US$17 billion of equity in the acquisition, reinsurance, consolidation and management of life insurance companies. Together, these companies have served the needs of c. 13 million policyholders while managing over US$365 billion of assets.

His first Resolution vehicle consolidated four major UK closed life insurance companies from Royal Sun Alliance, Swiss Life, Britannic and Santander (Abbey National Life). The FTSE100 insurer was sold to Pearl Group in 2008.

His second Resolution vehicle merged FTSE100 insurer Friends Provident with AXA's UK life business and other assets. The company was sold to Aviva in 2015.

These two completed projects made significant total returns for shareholders.

His current business, Resolution Life, was founded in 2018 and today manages c.$90 billion of assets, employs c. 1,800 people and provide services to over 3m policyholders. It has operations in Bermuda, the U.K., the U.S., Australia and New Zealand, all focused on assisting the restructuring of the primary life insurance industry globally.

According to The Sunday Times Rich List in 2019 his net worth was estimated at £137 million.

Charitable works
Since formation of his Resolution vehicles Cowdery has devoted half of all proceeds to charity. The Resolution Foundation, an independent social and economic research organisation set up by Cowdery in 2005, purports to be one of Britain's leading authorities on low earners and the policy responses required to lift their living standards.

Other professional interests
Cowdery is owner and publisher of the magazine Prospect and a member of the governing council of The Institute for New Economic Thinking. Until February 2021, he was also a director of Best for Britain, a group campaigning to stop Brexit.

Honours
Cowdery was knighted in the 2016 New Year Honours for services to children and social mobility.

Personal life
Cowdery lives in London and has six children.

References

External links
Profile in The Guardian
Interview from The Times
 Resolution Foundation 
 https://www.theguardian.com/business/2011/feb/28/clive-cowdery-goes-on-mission-to-help-poor

1963 births
Living people
English businesspeople
English philanthropists
Knights Bachelor
Businesspeople awarded knighthoods
English people of Danish descent
Liberal Democrats (UK) donors